The New England League was a mid-level league in American minor league baseball that played intermittently in five of the six New England states (Vermont excepted) between 1886 and 1949. After 1901, it existed in the shadow of two Major League Baseball clubs in Boston and alongside stronger, higher-classification leagues.

In 1946, the NEL, the International League and the Canadian–American League – which all included farm teams of the Brooklyn Dodgers – were the first 20th century leagues (other than the Negro leagues) to permit African-Americans to play. The following season, Jackie Robinson and Larry Doby would integrate the major leagues.

Early history 
In 1877 a non–classified league first called the "New England League" played with the Fall River Casscades, Lowell Ladies Men, Lynn Live Oaks, Manchester Reds and Rhode Islands as members.

The New England League was next called the Eastern New England League beginning play in 1885 with five teams in Massachusetts and Maine. The five teams, playing an 80 game season were, Lawrence, Haverhill, Biddleford/Newburyport, Portland and Brockton, with Lawrence winning the 1885 championship. The league continued play and shortened its name after the 1885 season.

The newly named "New England League" played its first game in 1886, with the same five Eastern New England League clubs in Massachusetts and Maine, plus the addition of the Boston Blues as the sixth team. The first New England League champion was the Portland club. The league was inactive in 1889–1890, then resumed play from 1891 to 1915 (with the exception of 1900) under the presidency of Tim Murnane, the Boston Globe sportswriter. When the minor leagues were assigned classifications in 1902, the NEL was graded Class B, at that time two levels below major league status, equivalent to Class AA today.

Disruption caused by the outlaw Federal League and the coming of World War I caused the loop to reorganize in 1916 as the Eastern League, ending the NEL's most long-lived period of operation. The league attempted to revive in 1919, then closed down in early August. Seven years later, the NEL returned in 1926 with eight clubs in the region's mill towns, but the Great Depression devastated the minor leagues, and the NEL was no exception: it disbanded June 22, 1930. A 1933 revival was followed the next season by a name change to the Northeastern League – and another shutdown that would last through the 1940 baseball season.

Semi–pro league
The New England League was revived in May 1941 as a semi–pro league with eight franchises. Many players were in the military assigned to nearby bases, including some major league players (often playing under an assumed name). Football Hall of Famer, Major League umpire and NBA coach Hank Soar sometimes played for Pawtucket. Pawtucket's best pitcher in 1945 was once and future major league pitcher Randy Gumpert, pitching under the alias "Ralph Wilson".

The teams in 1941 were the New Bedford Whalers (which relocated to Cranston, Rhode Island on July 31), Pawtucket Slaters, Lynn Frasers, Worcester Nortons, Woonsocket Marquettes, Quincy Shipbuilders, Fall River, and Manchester (New Hampshire) Dexters. Pawtucket won the championship.

1942 saw seven teams take the field but one, the Fitchburg Blue Sox, dropped out early in the season. Pawtucket, Lynn, Manchester, Worcester, Quincy and Woonsocket all returned and Pawtucket again won the championship in October when the best-of-7 series against Manchester was halted after five games due to poor weather. In the middle of the championship series the Slaters hosted a game against the Boston Red Sox in front of over 9,000 fans.

Pawtucket played their first game at the new Pawtucket Stadium (present-day McCoy Stadium) on July 5 against Lynn with over 6,000 fans in attendance. 
 
By 1943, with the war, the League operated with just four teams. Pawtucket, Woonsocket and Quincy were back, joined by the Providence Frigates of Cranston.

Providence, which defeated Pawtucket for the championship in 1943, changed ballparks in 1944, moving from Cranston Stadium to Municipal Stadium in Central Falls, Rhode Island. Joining them were Pawtucket, Lynn, Woonsocket and Quincy. Lynn bested Pawtucket 3 games to 2 for the 1944 championship.

In 1945, Cranston returned to the fold joining Pawtucket and Lynn, the return of the Worcester Nortons and two new teams: the New London Diesels and the Lawrence, Massachusetts based Lawrence Millionaires. The Cranston Firesafes defeated Pawtucket for the championship, 4 games to 1.

From 1941 to 1945 the member teams regularly played exhibition matches against teams from other leagues. Major league teams, Negro league teams, famous barnstorming teams and military teams all found their way into New England League ballparks. For example, Pawtucket, with once and future major league players such as Danny MacFayden, Bob Whitcher, Ted Olson and Ed Murphy, hosted the Philadelphia Phillies, Boston Braves, New York Black Yankees, and in other years teams such as the Havana All-Stars, Boston Red Sox, New York Yankees, Boston Colored Giants, House of David and the Brooklyn Dodgers.

Return to professional status
In 1946 with the postwar baseball boom, the New England League was restored to an "affiliated" eight–team Class B level circuit, but only half the teams had ties to a major league organization. Four of the six 1945 teams made the crossover: the Pawtucket Slaters (Boston Braves), Lynn Red Sox (Boston Red Sox), Cranston Chiefs (independent) and Lawrence Millionaires (independent). They were joined by the Manchester Giants (New York Giants), Nashua Dodgers (Brooklyn Dodgers) and two other independent teams: the Portland Gulls and Fall River Indians. Its most notable member, the Nashua Dodgers, was a Brooklyn farm club where, in 1946, African-American players and future Dodger greats Don Newcombe and Roy Campanella made their debuts as part of the handful of men who broke the baseball color line. The players succeeded on the field and were very complimentary in remarks about their Nashua experience in later years.

In 1947 the Cranston Chiefs had a working agreement with the Cincinnati Reds, and the Fall River Indians had the same arrangement with the Chicago White Sox. The still independent Lawrence Millionaires cancelled their home game against Pawtucket on July 14 and became the Lowell "Stars" the following day playing in Pawtucket, wearing the uniforms of a popular semi-pro team of the same name. A name-the-team contest never panned out, and the press began calling the team the Lowell Orphans; after August 18 they became a "road" team. Following the 1947 season the franchise was moved to Springfield as a farm team of the Chicago Cubs, and the Springfield Cubs became the only New England League team to survive the 1949 season, as one of the Cubs' two Class AAA team from 1950–1953.

Nashua was the most successful member of the postwar league, winning three consecutive playoff championships from 1946-48. But by the middle of 1949, it became clear that the New England League was not viable. The league began the season with eight teams, but the Providence Grays dropped out on June 20. In mid-July the New York Yankees announced they were withdrawing their support of the Manchester team, forcing the franchise to suspend operations. The unaffiliated teams in Lynn and Fall River then also announced they were suspending operations, and on July 20, 1949, the New England League closed out their "first half" with Nashua in first place, followed in order by the other surviving teams: Pawtucket, Portland and Springfield. The "second half" season of 38 games resumed with the four remaining teams and concluded with Pawtucket in first place, followed by Portland, Springfield and Nashua. Both halves combined shows Pawtucket as the best team some 10½ games above second-place Nashua. The Brooklyn Dodgers refused to allow Nashua to participate in any playoffs, wanting to pull the plug on the Nashua operation immediately, thus giving the Portland team a first-round bye in the playoffs, which saw Springfield defeat Pawtucket, 2 games to 0, then Portland taking Springfield in seven games. The league's final regular-season champ was the Pawtucket Slaters, a farm club of the Boston Braves, but the Portland Pilots, a Phillies affiliate, won the playoffs, thus bookending the championship earned by the Maine city's entry in the NEL's maiden season 63 years earlier.

List of teams
Attleboro, Massachusetts: Attleboro Burros (1928); Attleboro (1933)
Augusta, Maine: Augusta Kennebecs (1895–1896); Augusta (1901)
Bangor, Maine: Bangor Millionaires (1894–1896); Bangor (1901)
Boston, Massachusetts: Boston Blues (1886–1887); Boston Reds (1893)
Brockton, Massachusetts: Brockton (1886), (1892); Brockton Shoemakers (1893–1899, 1910–1913, 1928–1929); Brockton (1903); Brockton B's (1901); Brockton Tigers (1907–1909); Brockton Shoemakers (1933)
Cambridge, Massachusetts: Cambridge (1899)
Concord, New Hampshire: Concord Marines (1902–1905)
Dover, Delaware: Dover (1893), (1902)
Fall River, Massachusetts: Fall River Indians (1893–1898); Fall River Adopted Sons (1913); Fall River Brinies (1911–1912); Fall River Indians (1902–1910, 1946–1949)
Fitchburg, Massachusetts: Fitchburg (1899); Fitchburg Burghers (1914–1915); Fitchburg Foxes (1919); Fitchburg Wanderers (1929)
Gloucester, Massachusetts: Gloucester Hillies (1929)
Haverhill, Massachusetts: Haverhill (1886–1887), (1894); Haverhill Hustlers (1901–1912, 1914); Haverhill Climbers (1919); Haverhill Hillies (1926–1929)
Lawrence, Massachusetts: Lawrence/Salem (1887); Lawrence (1886, 1892, 1899): Lawrence Barristers (1911–1915); Lawrence Colts (1902–1910); Lawrence Barristers (1919); Lawrence Merry Macks (1926–1927); Lawrence Weavers (1933); Lawrence Millionaires (1946–1947)
Lewiston, Maine: Lewiston-Auburn Gazettes (1892); Lewiston (1891, 1893–1896); Lewiston (1901); Lewiston Cupids (1914–1915); Lewiston Red Sox (1919); Lewiston–Auburn Twins (1919);Lewiston Twins (1926–1930); 
Lowell, Massachusetts: Lowell Chippies (1888); Lowell Magicians (1887); Lowell (1892–1893); Lowell Lowells (1891); Lowell Grays (1912–1915); Lowell Tigers (1901–1911); Lowell Grays (1919); Lowell Highwaymen (1926); Lowell Millers (1929); Lowell Lauriers (1933); Lowell Orphans (1947) 
Lynn, Massachusetts: Lynn/Newburyport Clamdiggers (1886); Lynn Lions (1887); Lynn Shoemakers (1888); Lynn (1891); Lynn Fighters (1914); Lynn Live Oaks (1901); Lynn Leonardites (1911–1912); Lynn Pirates (1915); Lynn Shoemakers (1905–1910, 1913); Lynn Papooses (1926–1930); Lynn Red Sox (1946–1948); Lynn Tigers (1949) 
Manchester, New Hampshire: Manchester Farmers (1887); Manchester Maroons (1888); Manchester (1892–1893); Manchester Amoskeags (1891); Manchester Manchesters (1899); Manchester (1901–1905); Manchester Textiles (1906, 1914–1915); Manchester Blue Sox (1926–1930); *Manchester Giants (1946–1947); Manchester Yankees (1948–1949)
Nashua, New Hampshire: Nashua (1901–1905); Nashua Millionaires (1926–1927, 1929–1930); Nashua Millionaires (1933); Nashua Dodgers (1946–1949) 
New Bedford, Massachusetts: New Bedford Browns (1896); New Bedford Whalers (1895, 1897–1898,  1903–1913); New Bedford Millmen (1929); New Bedford Whalers (1933) 
Newport, Rhode Island: Newport Colts 1897–1899
Pawtucket, Rhode Island: Pawtucket (1892); Pawtucket Colts (1899); Pawtucket Maroons (1894–1896); Pawtucket Phenoms (1897); Pawtucket Tigers (1898); Pawtucket Slaters (1946–1949) 
Portland, Maine: Portland (1886–1888); Portland (1891–1896, 1901); Portland Phenoms (1899); Portland Duffs (1913–1915); Portland Blue Sox (1919); Portland Eskimos (1926–1927);Portland Mariners (1928–1930); Portland Gulls (1946); Portland Pilots (1947–1949)
Portsmouth, New Hampshire: Portsmouth Lillies (1888)
Providence, Rhode Island: Providence Chiefs (1946–1947); Providence Grays (1948–1949)
Quincy, Massachusetts: Quincy Shipbuilders (1933)
Salem, Massachusetts: Salem Fairies (1887); Salem (1891–1892) Salem Witches (1888, 1926–1928, 1930)
Springfield, Massachusetts: Springfield Cubs (1948–1949)
Taunton, Massachusetts: Taunton Herrings (1897–1899); Taunton Tigers (1905); Taunton Blues (1933)
Woonsocket, Rhode Island: Woonsocket (1891–1892, 1933)
Worcester, Massachusetts: Worcester Grays (1888); Worcester (1891, 1894, 1898); Worcester Busters (1906–1915); Worcester Chiefs (1933)

Baseball Hall of Fame alumni 
Jesse Burkett, 1906-1913 Worcester Busters 
Roy Campanella, 1946 Nashua Dodgers 
Roger Connor, 1897 Fall River Indians 
Hugh Duffy, 1887 Salem Fairies; 1887 Lowell Browns
Billy Hamilton, 1888 Worcester Grays; 1902–1904, 1906–1908 Haverhill Hustlers; 1909–1910 Lynn Shoemakers
Joe Kelley, 1891 Lowell Lowells 
Nap Lajoie, 1896 Fall River Indians 
Rabbit Maranville, 1910–1911 New Bedford Whalers
Christy Mathewson, 1899 Taunton Herrings 
Frank Selee, 1886  Haverhill

References

References
Johnson, Lloyd, and Wolff, Miles, editors: The Encyclopedia of Minor League Baseball. Durham, North Carolina: Baseball America, 1997.
Roper, Scott C., and Roper, Stephanie Abbot. "'We're Going to Give All We Have for this Grand Little Town': Baseball Integration and the 1946 Nashua Dodgers."  Historical New Hampshire 53:1/2 (Spring/Summer 1998) 3-19.
Tygiel, Jules. Baseball's Great Experiment:  Jackie Robinson and his Legacy.  New York:  Oxford University Press, 1997.

New England League
Sports leagues established in 1885
Sports leagues disestablished in 1949
Baseball leagues in Rhode Island
Baseball leagues in Massachusetts
Baseball leagues in Maine
Baseball leagues in Connecticut
Baseball leagues in New Hampshire